XHPL-FM is a radio station in Ciudad Acuña, Coahuila. Broadcasting on 99.7 FM, XHPL is known as FM Globo.

History
Pedro Rodríguez Olivares applied for and received a concession to own an FM station in Acuña in 1970, initially operating on 98.5 MHz. It was eventually sold to Alfredo Garza Garza; upon his passing, his heir, Guillermo Garza Castillo, took over the station.

In 2019, the concession was transferred to Radioblogs, S.A. de C.V. The station was traditionally known as Radio Felicidad until affiliating with MVS.

References

External links
XHPL-FM 99.7 Facebook

Radio stations in Coahuila